Legislative elections were held in Romania on 6 December 2020 to elect the 136 members of the Senate and the 330 constituent members of the Chamber of Deputies.

While the Social Democratic Party (PSD) remained the largest political party in the Parliament, its popular vote share dropped considerably, more specifically by a third. Following the elections, a centre-right coalition government was formed by the National Liberal Party (PNL), USR PLUS, and the Democratic Alliance of Hungarians (UDMR/RMDSZ) (i.e. the former Cîțu Cabinet) with Florin Cîțu as Prime Minister.

The final voter turnout was approximately 32%, the lowest since the end of the Communist era in Romania, partially due to the COVID-19 pandemic.

Electoral system
The 330 members of the Chamber of Deputies are elected by several methods: 308 are elected from 42 multi-member constituencies based on counties and Bucharest, using proportional representation, four are elected using proportional representation from a constituency representing Romanians living abroad. Parties must pass a threshold of 5% of the national vote or at least 20% of the vote in four constituencies. Further seats (currently 18) can be added for ethnic minority groups that compete in the elections and pass a special (lower) threshold (calculated as 10% of the votes needed to obtain one of the regular 312 seats).

The 136 members of the Senate are also elected using party-list proportional representation, but from 43 constituencies based on the 41 counties (a total of 121 seats), Bucharest (13 seats), and one for Romanians living overseas (two seats).

Government

The previous election saw the Social Democratic Party (PSD) led by Liviu Dragnea emerge as the largest political party in the parliament, although they fell short of an absolute majority. Nevertheless, the PSD eventually established a coalition agreement with the Alliance of Liberals and Democrats (ALDE), forming the Grindeanu Cabinet in January 2017. However, the new government did not last long and was replaced by the Tudose Cabinet in June 2017, which was also short-lived. Ultimately, the Dăncilă Cabinet took office in January 2018. It was dismissed by a motion of no confidence in October 2019, and replaced by a National Liberal Party (PNL) minority government under Ludovic Orban in November 2019. The Orban Cabinet was dismissed by a motion of no confidence on the 5 February 2020, but took office again on 14 March 2020.

Period before the political campaign
The government decided parliamentary elections would be held on 6 December 2020. On 30 September 2020, the president of the Alliance of Liberals and Democrats (ALDE), Călin Popescu-Tăriceanu, proposed on Facebook that the elections be postponed to March 2021. On 2 October 2020, former Save Romania Union (USR) deputy Adrian Dohotaru submitted a bill to the Senate, proposing the parliamentary elections be held on 14 March 2021, which received support from the Social Democratic Party (PSD). On 7 October 2020, the first vice-president of the PSD, Sorin Grindeanu, claimed that the government's plan would lead to a surge in COVID-19 cases. On 8 October, Călin Popescu-Tăriceanu and Victor Ponta announced in a press conference that their parties will run in the elections on a shared list under a single name:  Social-Liberal PRO Romania.

PSD president Marcel Ciolacu announced on 15 October that the World Health Organization's representative in Romania, Alexandru Rafila, was one of the party's candidates for the parliamentary elections. He will be top of the list of deputies for the Bucharest circumscription, while Gabriela Firea will lead the list of senators.

Parties 

The following table presents the composition of the Parliament of Romania during the 2016–2020 legislative term.

Opinion polls

Graphical summary

The chart below shows opinion polls conducted for the next Romanian legislative election. The trend lines represent local regressions (LOESS).

Party vote

Incidents 
An 80-year-old man from Teiu, Argeș fell into cardiac arrest and died outside a polling station on election day. He was known to have heart problems.

Two polling stations from Sector 3 of Bucharest had their voting suspended: for about an hour at polling station 551, after a member of the electoral bureau tested positive for COVID-19; and for two and a half hours at station 643, after the death of a voter.

Results 
Participation was 33.30% and 5.9 million valid votes were cast. After counting all votes, but before the settlement of any appeals, PSD has won around 29.5% of the votes, PNL around 25.5%, USR PLUS around 15.5%, AUR around 9%, and UDMR around 6%. The high result of the quasi-unknown party AUR was considered a huge surprise, while PMP and PRO Romania both failed to get 5% of the votes required to win any seats.

Senate

Chamber of Deputies

Aftermath 
On 18 December, the National Liberal Party (PNL), the USR PLUS, and the Democratic Alliance of Hungarians in Romania (UDMR) announced that they had reached a coalition agreement, and proposed finance minister Florin Cîțu as prime minister. The government would have two deputy prime ministers (one from USR PLUS and one from UDMR) and 18 ministries, with 9 allocated for the PNL, 6 for USR PLUS, and 3 for UDMR. The allocations are as follows (with newly created ministries italicized):

 PNL: Foreign Affairs Ministry, Defense Ministry, Finance Ministry, Interior Ministry, Education Ministry, Energy Ministry, Agriculture Ministry, Labor Ministry, and Culture Ministry
 USR PLUS: Justice Ministry, Transport Ministry, Health Ministry, Ministry of Research, Innovation and Digitization, and the Ministry of Economy, Entrepreneurship and Tourism
 UDMR: Ministry of Development, Public Works and Administration, the Ministry of Environment, Waters and Forests, and the Ministry of Youth and Sports

Cîțu was officially appointed as Prime Minister-designate on 22 December by President Klaus Iohannis. On 23 December, the Cabinet was invested by the parliament and took oath of office on the same evening.

The Romanian Electoral Authority stated that the campaign financing publicly subsidies amounted to a grand total of 166,850,315.50 Romanian Lei. The parties/candidates were required to achieve at least 3% of the vote to apply for a public subsidy of their campaign expenditures.

See also
2021 Romanian political crisis

Notes

References

External links

Official page of the 2020 Romanian legislative election

Legislative
Legislative
Parliamentary elections in Romania
Romania